Wah wah or wah-wah or variants may refer to:

Places
 Wah Wah Mountains, a north-south trending range in west-central Utah
 Wah Wah Valley, an endorheic valley within the Basin and Range of west-central Utah

Music
 Wah-wah (music), a musical special effect to produce voice-like tones
 Wah-wah pedal, a guitar effects pedal that produces these tones
 Wah Wah (album), a 1994 album by James
 Wah Wah, a 1986 album by The Quick
 "Wah-Wah" (song), a 1970 song by George Harrison from All Things Must Pass
 "Wah Wah", a 1994 song by Jimmy Page and Robert Plant from No Quarter
"Wah Wah", a 2016 song by King Gizzard & the Lizard Wizard from Nonagon infinity

Other
 Wah-Wah (film), a 2005 film by Richard E. Grant

See also 
 Wawa (disambiguation)
 Wah (disambiguation)